Silsila is a 1987 Pakistani Punjabi language Action film & musical film. directed by Aslam Dar and produced by Mian Farzand Ali.

Cast
 Sultan Rahi
 Anjuman
 Durdana Rehman
 Mustafa Qureshi - Sarang
 Babar 
 Talish
 Firdous Jamal
 Nasrullah Butt
 Zahir Shah
 Albela
 Bahar - Malka Jazbat
 Nazia Hafeez
 Arif Lohar
 Altaf Khan
 Jaggi Malik

Crew
Writer - Nasir Adeeb
Producer - Aslam Dar, R.J. Dar 
Production Company - R. J. Production
Cinematographer - Saeed Dar
Music Director - Master Rafiq Ali
Lyricist - Hazin Qadri, Waris Ludhianvi, Hamid Dar
Playback Singers - Noor Jehan, Humaira Channa, Arif Lohar

Soundtrack

References

External links
 http://www.citwf.com/film320730.htm Silsila (1987), film on C.I.T.W.F. website, Retrieved 5 Feb 2016

Pakistani action films
1987 films
Punjabi-language Pakistani films